Mae Ping National Park (อุทยานแห่งชาติแม่ปิง) is at the southern end of the Thanon Thong Chai Range, in Lamphun, Tak, and Chiang Mai Provinces in northern Thailand. Established on 13-07-1981, it is an IUCN Category II protected area measuring 627,346 rai ~ .
The park's main features are the Ping River, Koh Luang Waterfall, and Thung Kik-Thung Nangu meadows.

See also
List of national parks of Thailand
List of Protected Areas Regional Offices of Thailand

References

National parks of Thailand
Protected areas established in 1981
Geography of Lamphun province
Geography of Tak province
Geography of Chiang Mai province
Tourist attractions in Lamphun province
Tourist attractions in Tak province
Tourist attractions in Chiang Mai province
1981 establishments in Thailand
Thanon Thong Chai Range